NeuroIntegration Therapy (NIT) is a non-invasive combination therapy that integrates quantitative electroencephalography (qEEG or QEEG) brain mapping with additional therapies such as neurofeedback, vibroacoustic therapy, pulsed electromagnetic field therapy (PEMFT, or PEMF therapy) and photic stimulation (light therapy.)

Neurointegration therapy begins with a brain mapping session using qEEG to help visualize areas of dysregulation within the brain. The supporting therapies are then used to retrain the problem areas of the brain by rewarding the brainwaves when they move in a desired pattern. Follow up qEEG sessions demonstrate changes in brainwave patterns and signify if the therapeutic treatments require adjustments.

Application 
NeuroIntegration therapy is being used as a treatment for brain-related conditions such as chronic pain, addiction, and obesity.

The field of neurointegration therapy is relatively new and protocols have not been widely standardized. However, global initiatives are being taken to create a common language of information, to promote consistency in education and certification, and to form collaborative alliances with other mental and physical health disciplines.

Criticism 
Though neurointegration therapy itself has not received any published criticism, the individual components of the treatment have.

References 

Neuroimaging